Mbive "Peggy" Lokando (born 18 September 1989) is an English-born Congolese footballer who plays for Conference South club Billericay Town.

Career

Club career
He got scouted by Arsenal in 1999, after having been with Haringey Borough since he was around eight. On 7 August 2007 he signed a professional contract for Southend United, having joined the club six-months before. Lokando made his debut in a 2–0 home win in the League Cup against Watford on 28 August 2007. Lokando was loaned out to Dagenham & Redbridge in September 2008, but failed to make a league appearance.

After a spell with Isthmian League Division One North side Leyton in 2009, Lokando joined Conference National club Crawley Town in November. He made his debut for Crawley on 24 November in the 2–0 home win over Salisbury City, replacing Thomas Pinault as a substitute in the 90th minute.

He signed for St Albans City in February 2010.

On 19 September 2010, he made his debut for Carshalton Athletic in a 3–0 away win against Wealdstone in the Isthmian League Premier Division. Lokando moved to Billericay Town in January 2011, after being released from Carshalton before Christmas 2010.

Lokando then joined Isthmian League Division One North club Waltham Forest in September 2011. He moved on to fellow Isthmian League club Brentwood Town in February 2012. In February 2013 he decided to re-join Billericay Town.

International career
He gained his first cap for Democratic Republic of Congo national football team against Gabon on 25 March 2008.

References

External links

1989 births
Living people
Footballers from Greater London
Citizens of the Democratic Republic of the Congo through descent
Democratic Republic of the Congo footballers
Democratic Republic of the Congo international footballers
English footballers
English sportspeople of Democratic Republic of the Congo descent
Arsenal F.C. players
Southend United F.C. players
Dagenham & Redbridge F.C. players
Leyton F.C. players
Crawley Town F.C. players
St Albans City F.C. players
Carshalton Athletic F.C. players
Billericay Town F.C. players
Waltham Forest F.C. players
Brentwood Town F.C. players
National League (English football) players
Isthmian League players
Association football midfielders